Gramática do Kamaiurá, Língua Tupi-Guarani do Alto Xingu, by Lucy Seki,  is an authoritative and comprehensive description of Kamayurá, an indigenous language of Brazil.

Kamayurá is spoken by the people of the same name, which number about 290 as of 2005, living in two villages in the Xingu Indigenous Park, Brazil.

Book description
The book has 482 pages of text, plus 17 pages of color photos of the Kamayurá. Its thoroughness and completeness set it apart from most other books on American Indian languages, which usually give only an incomplete overview of their subject.

The book covers all aspects of the language, from phonology to anaphora and discourse structure. Moreover, the book is written in precise but readable Portuguese, avoiding the unnecessary use of technical jargon and theoretical discussions.  While not a textbook, this feature makes it accessible to non-linguists who have only basic knowledge of grammatical concepts.

The information given in the book was provided by native Kamayurá speakers, some of them monolingual.  The author recorded, transcribed an analyzed a corpus of over 40 narratives in Kamayurá. The text includes 16 pages on the history and culture of the Kamayurá, two maps of the Xingu reservation and its Indian villages, a lexicon with some 1200 words, about 1500 examples of analyzed phrases and sentences, a 10-page bibliography, and a fully analyzed 100-line excerpt from one of those narratives.

Testimonials
From the preface by linguist Bernard Comrie: The Kamayurá Grammar of Dr. Seki is one of the best grammars of a living Brazilian indigenous languages that I had the privilege of reading [...] It is also the first modern comprehensive descriptive grammar of a Brazilian indigenous language written by a Brazilian.

From the back cover endorsement by linguist R. M. W. Dixon: In fact, Dr. Seki's book on the Kamayurá is the first comprehensive grammar of an Indian language by a Brazilian since Anchieta's description of Tupinambá in 1595.

References
 Gramática do Kamaiurá, Língua Tupi-Guarani do Alto Xingu. Editora UNICAMP and São Paulo State Official Press (2000, in Portuguese). .

2000 non-fiction books
Tupi–Guarani languages
Grammar books